The Ak-Suu or Yokhsu/Oqsu is a left tributary of the Syr Darya, flowing through Batken Region of Kyrgyzstan and Sughd Region of Tajikistan. The river is formed at the north slopes of Turkestan Range in Sarkent State Nature Park. It flows into the river Syr Darya near the town Navkat in northern Tajikistan. The main settlements at the river are the village Ak-Suu in Kyrgyzstan and the town Navkat in Tajikistan.

References

Rivers of Kyrgyzstan
Rivers of Tajikistan